John Thomson (November 20, 1780December 2, 1852) was a United States Representative from Ohio.

Born in the Kingdom of Ireland, Thomson immigrated with his parents to the United States in 1787. He completed preparatory studies. He studied medicine, and in 1806, he moved to New Lisbon, Ohio, and practiced. He served in the Ohio Senate in 1814, 1815, and 1817–1820 and in the Ohio House of Representatives in 1816.

Thomson was elected to the Nineteenth Congress (March 4, 1825 – March 3, 1827). He was an unsuccessful candidate for reelection in 1826 to the Twentieth Congress.

Thomson was elected as a Jacksonian to the Twenty-first and to the three succeeding Congresses (March 4, 1829 – March 3, 1837). He was not a candidate for renomination in 1836. He resumed the practice of medicine.

He died in New Lisbon (now Lisbon), Columbiana County, Ohio, December 2, 1852. He was interred in New Lisbon Cemetery.

Sources

1780 births
1852 deaths
Members of the Ohio House of Representatives
Ohio state senators
People from Lisbon, Ohio
Irish emigrants to the United States (before 1923)
Physicians from Ohio
Jacksonian members of the United States House of Representatives from Ohio
19th-century American politicians